The quad doubles event at the 2012 Paralympic Games took place on 2 September – 5 September, at Eton Manor, London.

Calendar

Seeds
  /  (silver medalists)
  /  (gold medalists)

Draw

Key

INV = Bipartite invitation
ITF = ITF place
ALT = Alternative
r = Retired
w/o = Walkover

References 
 
 

Quad doubles